Tanyu Kiryakov (born 2 March 1963) is a Bulgarian pistol shooter, the first shooter to have won Olympic gold medals in both the 50 metre pistol event and the 10 metre air pistol event, in which he was also the first Olympic champion. He is also the only Bulgarian to have won two gold medals from Summer Olympics. He is considered to be one of the all-time best and his versatile skills and continued excellence have won him numerous fans. He was born in Ruse.

External links 
 Kiryakov's profile at ISSF NEWS

1963 births
Living people
Bulgarian male sport shooters
ISSF pistol shooters
Olympic shooters of Bulgaria
Shooters at the 1988 Summer Olympics
Shooters at the 1992 Summer Olympics
Shooters at the 1996 Summer Olympics
Shooters at the 2000 Summer Olympics
Shooters at the 2004 Summer Olympics
Shooters at the 2008 Summer Olympics
Olympic gold medalists for Bulgaria
Olympic bronze medalists for Bulgaria
Sportspeople from Ruse, Bulgaria
Olympic medalists in shooting

Medalists at the 2000 Summer Olympics
Medalists at the 1996 Summer Olympics
Medalists at the 1988 Summer Olympics
20th-century Bulgarian people